Thanikattu Raja is a 1982 Indian Tamil-language action film written and directed by V. C. Guhanathan, and Produced by D. Ramanaidu. It stars Rajinikanth, Sridevi and Sripriya, with Jaishankar, Vijayakumar, Sathyakala and Y. G. Mahendran in supporting roles. the film had music by Ilayaraja and cinematography handled by P. S. Nivas.

Plot 

Soori is a rebellious young man who works as a mechanic and often lands in trouble fighting for justice. He falls in love with a rich girl Vaani, but Vaani's father plots to break their relationship through his manager Vasu. In the ensuing melee, Soori murders the manager to save Vaani's honour. Soori is about to be sentenced to death and Vaani finds that the only way she can save Soori is by marrying a rich, roguish man Ethiraj who uses his money to get Soori's death penalty commuted to a prison term.

After his release, Soori is distraught at losing Vaani and takes to drinking. He moves to his village where he becomes immensely popular among the villagers due to his righteous work and progressive activities. He offers protection to a village damsel Vidhya to escape from being forced to be a prostitute and later marries her but still remains alcoholic. Vaani meets and advises him to stop drinking and turn over a new leaf. Despite being abused by her husband and falsely accused of hobnobbing with Soori, Vaani maintains the sanctity of her marriage. Whether Soori and Vaani's lives return to normal forms the rest of the story.

Cast 

 Rajinikanth as Soori (Sooriya Prakash)
 Sridevi as Vani
 Sripriya as Vidhya
 Jaishankar as Ethiraj
 Major Sundarrajan as Jayaprakash
 Sangili Murugan as Vadivelu
 Y. G. Mahendran as Ravi
 Vijayakumar as Vasu
 Senthamarai as Landlord
 V. K. Ramasamy as 'Salaiyur' S.K.R
 Vennira Aadai Moorthy as Kannisamy
 Thengai Srinivasan as Siva (Kanakkupillai)
 R. S. Manohar as Rajasekhar
 Sathyakala as Seetha
 Rajesh as Ethiraj's brother
 K . Kannan as Paranthaman
 Master Haja Sheriff
 K. Natraj as Village people
 C. L. Anandhan as Henchman
 Oru Viral Krishna Rao as Tea shop owner
 M. R. R. Vasu as Uncle of Vidya
 Usilai Mani as Village people
 Y. Vijaya as Madhavi
 Idichapuli Selvaraj as Ponnusamy
 Jr. Manohar as Friend of Soori
 I. S. Ramachandran as Ramu
 V. Gopalakrishnan as Sangaralingam
 Silk Smitha as (Special Appearance)

Themes 
According to Jump Cut, Thanikattu Raja "explores the connections between landlords and politicians, who together oppress the rural population".

Soundtrack 
Tamil
The soundtrack was composed by Ilaiyaraaja and had six songs. "Mullai Arumbe" did not feature in the film but was part of the album. The lyrics for the songs were written by Vaali and Panchu Arunachalam.

Hindi
Brij Bihari wrote the lyrics for all the songs in the Hindi dubbed version.

Release 
The film was released on 12 March 1982.

References

External links 
 

1980s Tamil-language films
1982 action films
1982 films
Films directed by V. C. Guhanathan
Films scored by Ilaiyaraaja
Indian action films
Suresh Productions films